This list contains the mobile country codes and mobile network codes for networks with country codes between 600 and 699, inclusively – a region that covers Africa and the surrounding islands (excluding the Canary Islands and Madeira, which are part of Spain and Portugal, respectively).

National operators

A

Algeria – DZ

Angola – AO

B

Benin – BJ

Botswana – BW

Burkina Faso – BF

Burundi – BI

C

Cameroon – CM

Cape Verde – CV

Central African Republic – CF

Chad – TD

Comoros – KM

Congo – CG

D

Democratic Republic of the Congo – CD

Djibouti – DJ

E

Egypt – EG

Equatorial Guinea – GQ

Eritrea – ER

Eswatini – SZ

Ethiopia – ET

F

French Departments and Territories in the Indian Ocean (France) – YT/RE  
Includes
 Mayotte (France) – YT
 Réunion (France) – RE

G

Gabon – GA

Gambia – GM

Ghana – GH

Guinea – GN

Guinea-Bissau – GW

I

Ivory Coast – CI

K

Kenya – KE

L

Lesotho – LS

Liberia – LR

Libya – LY

M

Madagascar – MG

Malawi – MW

Mali – ML

Mauritania – MR

Mauritius – MU

Morocco – MA

Mozambique – MZ

N

Namibia – NA

Niger – NE

Nigeria – NG

R

Rwanda – RW

S

Saint Helena, Ascension and Tristan da Cunha – SH

São Tomé and Príncipe – ST

Senegal – SN

Seychelles – SC

Sierra Leone – SL

Somalia – SO

South Africa – ZA

South Sudan – SS

Sudan – SD

T

Tanzania – TZ

Togo – TG

Tunisia – TN

U

Uganda – UG

Z

Zambia – ZM

Zimbabwe – ZW

See also
 List of mobile network operators of the Middle East and Africa
 List of LTE networks in Africa

References

Telecommunications lists
Africa-related lists